Wigsley  is a village and civil parish in Nottinghamshire, England. The population of the civil parish taken at the 2011 census was 178. It is located 10 miles west of Lincoln. To the south-west of the village are the remains of R.A.F. Wigsley airfield. Wigsley is one of the Thankful Villages – those rare places that were spared fatalities in the Great War of 1914 to 1918.

References

External links

Villages in Nottinghamshire
Newark and Sherwood